Sarab-e Key Mirzavand Du (also Romanized as Sarāb-e Key Mīrzāvand Dū) is a village in Dowreh Rural District, Chegeni District, Dowreh County, Lorestan Province, Iran. At the 2006 census, its population was 289, in 76 families.

References 

Towns and villages in Dowreh County